The diocesan system of the Roman Catholic Church in Venezuela, united in the episcopal conference, comprises :
 nine Latin ecclesiastical provinces, each headed by a metropolitan (who has an archdiocese), including a total of 23 suffragandioceses each headed by a bishop. 
 four exempt Latin jurisdictions : the military ordinariate and three pre-diocesan apostolic vicariates.
 two Eastern Catholic exempt apostolic exarchates for rite-specific particular churches sui iuris

Current Dioceses

Exempt Latin Sui iuris Jurisdictions 
 Military Ordinariate of Venezuela, for the armed forces
 pre-diocesan missionary circumscriptions:
 Vicariate Apostolic of Caroní
 Vicariate Apostolic of Puerto Ayacucho
 Vicariate Apostolic of Tucupita

Latin ecclesiastical provinces

Ecclesiastical province of Barquisimeto 
 Metropolitan Archdiocese of Barquisimeto
Diocese of Acarigua–Araure
Diocese of Carora
Diocese of Guanare
Diocese of San Felipe

Ecclesiastical province of Calabozo 
 Metropolitan Archdiocese of Calabozo
Diocese of San Fernando de Apure
Diocese of Valle de la Pascua

Ecclesiastical province of Caracas, Santiago de Venezuela 
 Metropolitan Archdiocese of Caracas, Santiago de Venezuela
Diocese of Guarenas
Diocese of La Guaira
Diocese of Los Teques
Diocese of Petare

Ecclesiastical province of Ciudad Bolívar 
 Metropolitan Archdiocese of Ciudad Bolívar
Diocese of Ciudad Guayana
Diocese of Maturín

Ecclesiastical province of Coro 
 Metropolitan Archdiocese of Coro
Diocese of Punto Fijo

Ecclesiastical province of Cumana 
 Metropolitan Archdiocese of Cumaná
Diocese of Barcelona
Diocese of Carúpano
Diocese of El Tigre
Diocese of Margarita

Ecclesiastical province of Maracaibo 
 Metropolitan Archdiocese of Maracaibo
Diocese of Cabimas
Diocese of El Vigia-San Carlos del Zulia
Diocese of Machiques

Ecclesiastical province of Mérida 
 Metropolitan Archdiocese of Mérida
Diocese of Barinas
Diocese of Guasdualito
Diocese of San Cristóbal de Venezuela
Diocese of Trujillo

Ecclesiastical province of Valencia en Venezuela 
 Metropolitan Archdiocese of Valencia en Venezuela
Diocese of Maracay
Diocese of Puerto Cabello
Diocese of San Carlos de Venezuela

Eastern Catholic Sui iuris Jurisdictions 
For rite-specific Particular churches sui iuris, subject to their Patriarchs :

 Byzantine rite, under the Melkite Catholic Patriarchate of Antioch :
 Melkite Greek Catholic Apostolic Exarchate of Venezuela

 Antiochian Rite, under the Syriac Catholic Patriarchate of Antioch :
 Syriac Catholic Apostolic Exarchate of Venezuela

Defunct jurisdictions 
There are no titular sees.

All former prelatures have current successor jurisdictions, mostly after promotion.

Gallery of Archdiocesan sees

Sources and external links 
 GCatholic.org.
 Catholic-Hierarchy entry 

Venezuela
Catholic dioceses